The Toucheng Leisure Farm is a recreational farm in Toucheng Township, Yilan County, Taiwan.

History
The farm was established in 1979.

Architecture
The farm spreads over an area of 120 hectares. It features the main farmhouses and rice culture area. It has accommodation for 500 guests.

Transportation
The farm is accessible by walking distance west from Guishan Station of Taiwan Railways.

See also
 List of tourist attractions in Taiwan

References

External links

 

1979 establishments in Taiwan
Farms in Yilan County, Taiwan